Thisted is a town in the municipality of Thisted in the North Denmark Region of Denmark. It has a population of 13,461 (1 January 2022) and is located in Thy, in northwestern Jutland.

Market town status was given to Thisted in 1500.

Name 
The town's name derives from the Germanic deity Tyr and could be translated as Tyr's Stead.

History 

During the Jutland Peasant rebellion of 1441, Christopher of Bavaria, King of Denmark, approached the rebel camp at Husby Hole near St. Jørgen's Hill in northern Jutland and sent word that anyone who left the camp and went home, would not be punished for rebellion. The men from Thisted, as well as those of Mors, left for which they were afterwards called cowards and traitors.

In 1882, Thisted was connected with the Danish rail network as the Thy railway line between Thisted and Struer opened.

Geography 
Thisted is located in northwestern Jutland, in the traditional district of Thy, which forms the western part of the North Jutlandic Island. It is located on the northern shore of Thisted Bredning, a body of water between Thy and the island of Mors, which itself is a part of the Limfjord, a sound separating the North Jutlandic Island from the rest of the Jutland Peninsula. Thisted is located on three ridges, divided by two streams.

Demographics
Thisted has a population of 13,461, of which 6,622 males and 6,839 females (1 January 2022).

Economy
Thisted has a cluster of industries within food production: the Tican Slaughterhouse, Dragsbæk Maltfactory, Dragsbæk Margarinefactory, the brewery Thisted Bryghus, known for its high quality organic beer, and Premier Ice.

Cityscape

Burial mound

Langdos, the largest Bronze Age burial mound in Denmark, is located in Thisted. The burial mound is 175 meters long and was built between 1800 and 1000 BC.

Thisted Church

Thisted features a Gothic-style church, Thisted Church, which replaced a smaller Romanesque-style church around 1490. The exterior of the church contains a stone with Runic inscriptions.

Sports

Soccer
Thisted has a football team Thisted FC in the Danish 2nd Division (2022–2023 season)

Infrastructure

Rail

Thisted is served by Thisted railway station which opened in 1882. It is the northern terminus of the Thy railway line which connects Thisted with Struer to the south. Thisted station offers frequent local train services to Struer station with onward connections by train from Struer to the rest of Denmark. Until 2019, it also offered direct InterCity services to Copenhagen.

Air
The small Thisted Airport is owned by Thisted municipality, and is located 15 kilometers from Thisted. The airport opened in 1970, and until 2007 serviced daily flights between Thisted and the Danish capital, Copenhagen.

Education
There are several educational institutions in Thisted. There are three schools, Østre skole, Rolighedskolen, and Tingstrup skole. There's also a gymnasium, Higher Preparatory Examination, Higher Commercial Examination Programme and Higher Technical Examination Programme.

Notable people 

 Conrad Malte-Brun (1775 in Thisted – 1826) a Dano-French geographer, coined the name Oceania 
 Hendrik Pontoppidan (1814 in Thisted – 1901) a Danish merchant, consul and philanthropist
 Christen Mikkelsen Kold (1816 in Thisted – 1870) a teacher, created the Danish high-school system
 Knud Graah (1817–1909) a Norwegian industrialist and pioneer in the Norwegian textile industry
 Jens Peter Jacobsen (1847 in Thisted – 1885) a Danish novelist, poet and scientist 
 Peter Tom-Petersen (1861 in Thisted – 1926) a painter and graphic artist of cityscapes and interiors 
 Grethe Rask (1930 in Thisted – 1977) a physician and surgeon in Zaïre, one of the first non-Africans to die of AIDS
 Yutte Stensgaard (born 1946) an actress, known for her role in Hammer's Lust for a Vampire (1971)
 Mogens Dahl (born 1953 in Thisted) a Danish conductor, founded Mogens Dahl Concert Hall
 Kato (DJ) (born 1981 in Thisted) stage name of Thomas Kato Vittrup, a DJ and music producer 
 Junior Senior (active 1998–2008) a pop duo from Thisted, Denmark

Sport 

 Annette Jørgensen (born 1966 in Thisted) a swimmer, competed in the 1988 Summer Olympics
 Jesper Grønkjær (born 1977 in Nuuk, Greenland) raised in Thisted, is a former Danish professional footballer
 Mads Agesen (born 1983 in Thisted) a Danish footballer, captain at Randers FC
 Frederikke Thøgersen (born 1995 in Thisted) a Danish professional football player, plays for Fortuna Hjørring and the Denmark women's national football team
 Malthe Jakobsen (born 2003 in Thisted) a Danish racing driver

Emigrants to the United States 
 Hans Ditlev Bendixsen (1842 in Thisted – 1902) (emigrated c.1865) an American shipbuilder, developed the merchant marine industry on the West Coast of the United States
 Lawrence Waldemar Tonner (1861 in Thisted – 1947) (emigrated 1870) companion and personal secretary of composer and pianist Francis Grierson for more than 40 years

See also
Østerild Wind Turbine Test Field

References

 

 
Municipal seats of the North Jutland Region
Municipal seats of Denmark
Cities and towns in the North Jutland Region
Thisted Municipality